DYNY (107.9 FM), broadcasting as 107.9 Win Radio, is a radio station owned by Mabuhay Broadcasting System and operated by ZimZam Management, Inc. The station's studio and transmitter are located at Room 302, Delta Bldg., Quezon St., Iloilo City.

History
The station began operations in 1992 as YNY 107 with a modern rock format. It was formerly under the ownership of Progressive Broadcasting Corporation. In 1994, it rebranded as NU 107 with the slogan Iloilo's Rock Radio. In 2000, it became a relay station of DWNU in Manila. In 2012, it began airing its own local programming under the Win Radio network.

In 2016, after House Bill No. 5982 was passed into law, Mabuhay Broadcasting System acquired the provincial stations of PBC.

References

Radio stations in Iloilo City
Radio stations established in 1992